Love Life is a musical written by Kurt Weill (music) and Alan Jay Lerner (book and lyrics). It opened at the 46th Street Theatre on Broadway (now the Richard Rodgers) on October 7, 1948, and closed on May 14, 1949, after having played 252 performances. The original production starred Ray Middleton and Nanette Fabray, was directed by Elia Kazan, and choreographed by Michael Kidd.

The show told the story of a married couple, Sam and Susan Cooper, who never age as they progress from 1791 to 1948, encountering difficulties in their marriage (and thus the very fabric of marriage) as they struggle to cope with changing social mores. One of the earliest examples of the concept musical, the action of Love Life was interspersed with vaudeville-style numbers that commented on the story, in a way very similar to Cabaret (which opened in 1966).

No official cast recording of Love Life has ever been made; a strike at the time of the original production prevented preserving the original cast of this show, as also happened with Where's Charley?, which opened four days later, on Oct. 11, 1948.

The song "I Remember it Well" is the original version of a lyric Lerner revised for use in the 1958 film, Gigi.

Musical Numbers

Part One
The Magician
Opening (Waltz) - The Magician, Sam, and Susan
The Cooper Family
Who Is Samuel Cooper? - Mary Jo, George, Jonathan, Charlie, Hank, and Women
My Name Is Samuel Cooper - Sam
Here I'll Stay - Sam and Susan
Eight Men
Progress - The Go-Getters
The Farewell
I Remember It Well - Sam and Susan
Green Up-Time - Susan, Men and Women
Polka and Green Up-Time (Reprise) - Susan, Johnny, Men and Women
I Remember It Well (Reprise) - Sam, Susan, Johnny and Elizabeth
Quartette
Economics - Quartette
Susan's Dream [Cut Song] - Quartette
The New Baby
Prelude and Postlude to Scene - Orchesta
Three Tots and A Woman
Mother's Getting Nervous - Three Tots
Trapeze Specialty - Trapeze Artist
Foxtrot (with Encore) - Three Tots
My Kind of Night
My Kind Of Night - Sam
Women's Club Blues - Susan and Women
My Kind of Night (Reprise) - Sam
Love Song
Progress (Reprise with Soft Shoe) [Cut Song] - The Go-Getters
Love Song - Hobo
The Cruise
I'm Your Man - Sam, Slade, Boylan, Harvey, and Leffcourt
You Understand Me So [Cut Song] - Susan and Taylor
Finale Part One: I'm Your Man (Reprise) - Entire Company

Part Two
Madrigal Singers
Ho, Billy O! - Leader and Singers
Radio Night
The Locker Room Boys [Cut and Replaced with Madrigal Singers]
The Locker Room - Locker Room Boys
Farewell Again
I Remember It Well (Reprise) - Sam and Susan
Is It Him or Is It Me? - Susan
The All-American Puppet Ballet Present Punch and Judy Get A Divorce
Prologue - Punch, Judy, Lawyer, Judge, Bell Hop, Corespondent
Courtroom - The same in addition to Two Lawyers, Flighty Pair, and Speedy Pair
Family Trio (Green Up-Time) - Child, Father, and Mother
Hep Cats (Economics) - Hep Cats
A Hotel Room
This Is The Life - Sam
The Minstrel Show
Here I'll Stay (Reprise) - Interlocutor
We're Sellin' Sunshine - Interlocutor and Minstrels
Introduction - Interlocutor, Sam, Susan, and Minstrels
Madame Zuzu - Miss Horoscope and Miss Mysticism
Takin' No Chances - Mr. Cynic
Mr. Right (Introduction) - Miss Ideal Man
Mr. Right - Susan
Finale Ultimo - Sam and Susan

References

External links
 
 Ovrtur.com listing

1948 musicals
Broadway musicals
Musicals by Alan Jay Lerner
Musicals by Kurt Weill
Tony Award-winning musicals